Laura Brown is a Canadian cyclist who competes on the track and road including as a member of the Canadian team pursuit team. As a reserve, Brown was part of the Canadian team that won a bronze medal at the 2012 London Olympics in the women's team pursuit. She was also part of the team that won gold at the 2011 Pan American Games in the team pursuit. She also won the points race at the Manchester round of the 2013–14 UCI Track Cycling World Cup. Brown took up cycling in 2002 after giving up competing in gymnastics due to an ongoing back injury. In October 2014 the UnitedHealthcare Women's Team announced that Brown would be part of their squad for the 2015 season.

In 2016, she was officially named in Canada's 2016 Olympic team.

Major results
2013
1st Points Race, Challenge International sur piste
Los Angeles Grand Prix
1st Team Pursuit (with Allison Beveridge, Gillian Carleton, Jasmin Glaesser and Stephanie Roorda)
2nd Omnium
2015
1st  Team Pursuit, Pan American Games (with Allison Beveridge, Jasmin Glaesser and Kirsti Lay)

Early years
As a young gymnast, Laura Brown always wanted to compete at the Olympic Games. But after a back injury as a teenager, she switched sports and started cycling at the Olympic Oval in Calgary. While there, she watched Canada’s top speed skaters (including Clara Hughes, Catriona Le May Doan and Cindy Klassen) train before heading off to win multiple medals at Salt Lake City 2002. Those “superheroes” fired up her Olympic dream.

References

External links

1986 births
Canadian female cyclists
Commonwealth Games competitors for Canada
Cyclists from Alberta
Cyclists at the 2014 Commonwealth Games
Living people
Sportspeople from Calgary
Canadian track cyclists
Cyclists at the 2015 Pan American Games
Olympic cyclists of Canada
Olympic bronze medalists for Canada
Cyclists at the 2016 Summer Olympics
Pan American Games gold medalists for Canada
Pan American Games bronze medalists for Canada
Medalists at the 2016 Summer Olympics
Olympic medalists in cycling
Pan American Games medalists in cycling
Medalists at the 2015 Pan American Games
21st-century Canadian women